This is a list of high schools in the state of Iowa. You can also see a list of school districts in Iowa.  Where the high school information is on the school district page, the link below will direct you to the district page.

Adair County
 AC/GC High School (Adair–Casey/Guthrie Center), Guthrie Center
 Nodaway Valley High School, Greenfield
 Orient-Macksburg High School, Orient

Adams County
 Southwest Valley High School, Corning

Allamakee County
 Kee High School, Lansing
 John R. Mott High School, Postville
 Waukon High School, Waukon

Appanoose County
 Centerville High School, Centerville
 Moravia High School, Moravia
 Moulton-Udell High School, Moulton

Audubon County
Audubon High School, Audubon

Benton County
 Belle Plaine High School, Belle Plaine
 Benton Community High School, Van Horne
 Vinton-Shellsburg High School, Vinton

Black Hawk County
 Don Bosco High School, Gilbertville
 Dunkerton High School, Dunkerton
 Hudson High School, Hudson
 Union High School, La Porte

Cedar Falls
 Cedar Falls High School
 St. Patrick Catholic School
 Valley Lutheran School

Waterloo
 Columbus High School
 Waterloo Christian School
 Waterloo East High School
 Waterloo West High School

Boone County
 Boone High School, Boone
 Ogden High School, Ogden

Bremer County
 Denver High School, Denver
 Janesville High School, Janesville
 Sumner-Fredericksburg High School, Sumner
 Tripoli High School, Tripoli
 Wapsie Valley High School, Fairbank
 Waverly-Shell Rock Community School District
 Waverly-Shell Rock Senior High School, Waverly
 Waverly-Shell Rock Lied Center, Waverly

Buchanan County
 East Buchanan High School, Winthrop
 Independence High School, Independence
 Jesup High School, Jesup

Buena Vista County
 Alta–Aurelia High School, Alta
 Newell-Fonda High School, Newell
 Sioux Central High School, Sioux Rapids

Storm Lake
 St. Mary's High School
 Storm Lake High School

Butler County
 Aplington–Parkersburg High School, Parkersburg
 Clarksville High School, Clarksville
 North Butler High School, Greene

Calhoun County
 Manson–Northwest Webster High School, Manson
 South Central Calhoun High School, Lake City

Carroll County
 Carroll High School, Carroll
 Coon Rapids-Bayard High School, Coon Rapids
 Glidden–Ralston High School, Glidden
 Kuemper Catholic High School, Carroll
 IKM–Manning High School, Manning

Cass County
 Atlantic High School, Atlantic
 CAM High School, Massena
 Griswold High School, Griswold

Cedar County
 Tipton High School, Tipton
 Durant High School, Durant
 North Cedar High School, Clarence

West Branch
 Scattergood Friends School
 West Branch High School

Cerro Gordo County
 Clear Lake High School, Clear Lake

Mason City
 Mason City High School
 Mason City Alternative High School
 Newman Catholic High School
 North Iowa Christian School

Cherokee County
 MMRCU High School, Marcus
 Washington High School, Cherokee

Chickasaw County
 Sumner-Fredericksburg High School, Fredericksburg
 Nashua-Plainfield Junior-Senior High School, Nashua
 New Hampton High School, New Hampton

Clarke County
 Clarke Community High School, Osceola
 Murray High School, Murray

Clay County
 Clay Central-Everly High School, Everly
 Spencer Community High School, Spencer

Clayton County
 Central Community High School, Elkader
 Clayton Ridge High School, Guttenberg
 Edgewood–Colesburg High School, Edgewood
 MFL Marmac High School, Monona

Clinton County
 Calamus–Wheatland High School, Wheatland
 Camanche High School, Camanche
 Central DeWitt High School, De Witt
 Northeast High School, Goose Lake

Clinton
 Clinton High School
 Prince of Peace Preparatory

Crawford County
 Ar-We-Va High School, Westside
 Denison High School, Denison

Dallas County
 Adel–De Soto–Minburn (ADM) High School, Adel
 Dallas Center–Grimes High School, Grimes
 Perry High School, Perry
 Van Meter High School, Van Meter
 Waukee High School, Waukee
 Woodward-Granger Community School District
 Woodward Academy, Woodward
 Woodward-Granger High School, Woodward

Davis County
 Davis County Community High School, Bloomfield

Decatur County
 Lamoni High School, Lamoni
 Mormon Trail High School, Garden Grove
 Central Decatur Junior-Senior High School, Leon

Delaware County
 Maquoketa Valley Senior High School, Delhi
 West Delaware High School, Manchester

Des Moines County
 Danville High School, Danville
 Mediapolis High School, Mediapolis
 West Burlington High School, West Burlington

Burlington
 Burlington Community High School
 Notre Dame High School

Dickinson County
 Harris–Lake Park High School, Lake Park
 Okoboji High School, Milford
 Spirit Lake High School, Spirit Lake

Dubuque County
 Cascade Junior/Senior High School, Cascade
 Western Dubuque High School, Epworth
 Beckman Catholic High School, Dyersville

Dubuque
 Alta Vista Campus
 Dubuque Senior High School
 Hempstead High School
 Wahlert High School

Emmet County
 North Union High School, Armstrong
 Estherville–Lincoln Central Community School District
 Estherville–Lincoln Central High School, Estherville
 Forest Ridge Community Youth Service High School, Gruver

Fayette County
 North Fayette Valley High School, West Union
 Oelwein High School, Oelwein
 Starmont High School, Arlington
 West Central High School, Maynard

Floyd County
 Charles City High School, Charles City
 Rockford Junior-Senior High School, Rockford

Franklin County
 Hampton–Dumont High School, Hampton
 West Fork High School, Sheffield

Fremont County
 Sidney High School, Sidney
 Fremont–Mills Junior–Senior High School, Tabor

Greene County
 Paton-Churdan High School, Churdan
 Greene County High School, Jefferson

Grundy County
 BCLUW High School, Conrad
 Dike–New Hartford High School, Dike
 Gladbrook–Reinbeck High School, Reinbeck
 Grundy Center High School, Grundy Center

Guthrie County
 AC/GC High School, Guthrie Center
 Panorama High School, Panora
 West Central Valley High School, Stuart

Hamilton County
 South Hamilton High School, Jewell
 Webster City High School, Webster City

Hancock County
 Garner-Hayfield High School, Garner
 West Hancock High School, Britt

Hardin County
 AGWSR High School, Ackley
 South Hardin High School, Eldora
 Iowa Falls-Alden High School, Iowa Falls

Harrison County
 Boyer Valley Middle/High School, Dunlap
 Logan–Magnolia Junior/Senior High School, Logan
 Missouri Valley High School, Missouri Valley
 West Harrison High School, Mondamin
 Woodbine High School, Woodbine

Henry County
 Mount Pleasant Community High School, Mount Pleasant
 New London High School, New London
 WACO High School, Wayland
 Winfield-Mt Union Junior-Senior High School, Winfield

Howard County
 Crestwood High School, Cresco
 Riceville High School, Riceville

Humboldt County
 Humboldt High School, Humboldt

Ida County
 OABCIG High School, Ida Grove
 Ridge View High School, Holstein

Iowa County
 English Valleys Jr/Sr High School, North English
 H-L-V Junior-Senior High School, Victor
 Iowa Valley Junior-Senior High School, Marengo
 Williamsburg Junior-Senior High School, Williamsburg

Jackson County
 Easton Valley High School, Preston
 Maquoketa Community High School, Maquoketa

Bellevue
 Bellevue High School
 Marquette High School

Jasper County
 Baxter High School, Baxter
 Colfax–Mingo High School, Colfax
 Lynnville–Sully High School, Sully
 Newton Community School District
 Basics and Beyond Alternative School, Newton
 Newton Senior High School, Newton
 PCM High School, Monroe

Jefferson County
 Pekin Community High School, Packwood

Fairfield
 Fairfield High School
 Maharishi High School

Johnson County
 Clear Creek–Amana High School, Tiffin
 Liberty High School, North Liberty
 Lone Tree Junior-Senior High School, Lone Tree
 Solon High School, Solon

Iowa City
 Iowa City High School
 Iowa City West High School
 Regina High School
 Tate High School

Jones County
 Anamosa High School, Anamosa
 Midland Community High School, Wyoming
 Monticello High School, Monticello

Keokuk County
 Keota High School, Keota
 Sigourney Junior-Senior High School, Sigourney
 Tri-County High School, Thornburg

Kossuth County
 North Union High School, Armstrong

Algona
 Algona High School
 Bishop Garrigan High School

Lee County
 Central Lee High School, Donnelson
 Keokuk High School, Keokuk

Fort Madison
 Fort Madison High School
 Holy Trinity Catholic Schools

Linn County
Alburnett Junior-Senior High School, Alburnett
 Center Point-Urbana High School, Center Point
 Central City High School, Central City
Linn-Mar High School, Marion
 Lisbon High School, Lisbon
 Marion High School, Marion
 Mount Vernon High School, Mount Vernon
 North-Linn Senior High School, Troy Mills
 Springville High School, Springville

Cedar Rapids
 Cedar Valley Christian School
 Isaac Newton Christian Academy
 Thomas Jefferson High School
 John F. Kennedy High School
 Metro High School
 Prairie High School
 Xavier High School
 George Washington High School

Louisa County
 Louisa–Muscatine Junior/Senior High School, Letts
 Columbus Community High School, Columbus Junction
 Wapello Senior High School, Wapello

Lucas County
 Chariton High School, Chariton

Lyon County
 Central Lyon Senior High School, Rock Rapids
 George–Little Rock Senior High School, George
 West Lyon High School, Inwood

Madison County
 Earlham Senior High School, Earlham
 Interstate 35 High School, Truro
 Winterset Senior High School, Winterset

Mahaska County
 Eddyville–Blakesburg–Fremont High School, Eddyville
 North Mahaska Junior-Senior High School, New Sharon
 Oskaloosa High School, Oskaloosa

Marion County
 Knoxville High School, Knoxville
 Melcher-Dallas High School, Melcher
 Pleasantville High School, Pleasantville
 Twin Cedars Junior-Senior High School, Bussey

Pella
 Pella Christian High School
 Pella High School

Marshall County
 East Marshall Senior High School, Le Grand
 Marshalltown High School, Marshalltown
 West Marshall High School, State Center

Mills County
 East Mills High School, Malvern
 Glenwood High School, Glenwood

Mitchell County
  Osage High School, Osage
 St. Ansgar High School, St. Ansgar

Monona County
 MVAOCOU High School, Mapleton
 West Monona High School, Onawa
 Whiting Senior High School, Whiting

Monroe County
 Albia High School, Albia

Montgomery County
 Red Oak High School, Red Oak
 Stanton High School, Stanton

Muscatine County
 Muscatine High School, Muscatine
 West Liberty High School, West Liberty
 Wilton Junior-Senior High School, Wilton

O'Brien County
 Hartley–Melvin–Sanborn High School, Hartley
 Sheldon High School, Sheldon
 South O'Brien High School, Paullina

Osceola County
 Sibley-Ocheyedan High School, Sibley

Page County
 Clarinda High School, Clarinda
 Essex Junior-Senior High School, Essex
 Shenandoah High School, Shenandoah
 South Page High School, College Springs

Palo Alto County
 Emmetsburg High School, Emmetsburg
 Graettinger-Terril High School, Graettinger
 Ruthven-Ayrshire High School, Ruthven
 West Bend–Mallard High School, West Bend

Plymouth County
 Akron–Westfield Senior High School, Akron
 Hinton High School, Hinton
 Kingsley–Pierson High School, Kingsley
 St. Mary's High School, Remsen

Le Mars
 Gehlen Catholic High School
 Le Mars High School

Pocahontas County
 Pocahontas Area High School, Pocahontas

Polk County
 Bondurant–Farrar Junior-Senior High School, Bondurant
 Johnston High School, Johnston
 North Polk High School, Alleman
 Southeast Polk High School, Runnells
 Urbandale High School, Urbandale

Ankeny
 Ankeny Centennial High School
 Ankeny Christian Academy
 Ankeny High School

Des Moines
 Des Moines Christian School
 East High School
 Grand View Christian School
 Hoover High School
 Joshua Christian Academy
 Lincoln High School
 North High School
 Saydel High School
 Roosevelt High School

West Des Moines
 Dowling Catholic High School
 Valley High School
 Walnut Creek Campus

Pottawattamie County
 AHSTW High School, Avoca
 Riverside Community High School, Oakland
 Treynor High School, Treynor
 Tri-Center High School, Neola
 Underwood High School, Underwood

Council Bluffs
 Abraham Lincoln High School
 Heartland Christian School
 Kanesville Learning Center
 Lewis Central Senior High School
 St. Albert High School
 Thomas Jefferson High School

Poweshiek County
 Brooklyn-Guernsey-Malcom Junior-Senior High School, Brooklyn
 Grinnell Community Senior High School, Grinnell
 Montezuma High School, Montezuma

Ringgold County
 Diagonal Junior-Senior High School, Diagonal
 Mount Ayr High School, Mount Ayr

Sac County
 East Sac County High School, Lake View

Scott County
 North Scott High School, Eldridge
 Pleasant Valley High School, Riverdale

Bettendorf
 Bettendorf High School
 Rivermont Collegiate

Davenport
 Assumption High School
 Central High School
 Davenport Mid City High School
 Davenport West High School
 North High School

Shelby County
 Exira-Elk Horn-Kimballton High School, Elk Horn
 Harlan Community High School, Harlan

Sioux County
 Sioux Center High School, Sioux Center
 West Sioux High School, Hawarden

Hull
 Boyden-Hull High School
 Trinity Christian High School
 Western Christian High School

Orange City
 MOC-Floyd Valley High School
 Unity Christian High School

Rock Valley
 Netherlands Reformed Christian School
 Rock Valley High School

Story County
 Ames High School, Ames
 Ballard Community High School, Huxley
 Collins–Maxwell High School, Maxwell
 Colo–NESCO Senior High School, Colo
 Gilbert Junior-Senior High School, Gilbert
 Nevada High School, Nevada
 Roland–Story High School, Story City

Tama County
 GMG Secondary School, Garwin
 North Tama High School, Traer

Tama
 Meskwaki Settlement School
 South Tama County High School

Taylor County
 Bedford High School, Bedford
 Lenox High School, Lenox

Union County
 Creston Community High School, Creston
 East Union High School, Afton

Van Buren County
 Van Buren County Community Middle/High School, Keosauqua

Wapello County
 Cardinal High School, Eldon
 Ottumwa High School, Ottumwa

Warren County
 Carlisle High School, Carlisle
 Indianola High School, Indianola
 Martensdale-St. Marys Junior-Senior High School, Martensdale
 Norwalk Senior High School, Norwalk
 Southeast Warren Junior-Senior High School, Liberty Center

Washington County
 Highland High School, Riverside
 Hillcrest Academy, Kalona
 Mid-Prairie High School, Wellman
 Washington High School, Washington

Wayne County
 Seymour High School, Seymour
 Wayne Community Junior/Senior High School, Corydon

Webster County
 Southeast Valley High School, Gowrie

Fort Dodge
 Fort Dodge Senior High School
 St. Edmond High School

Winnebago County
 Forest City High School, Forest City
 Lake Mills Senior High School, Lake Mills
 North Iowa High School, Buffalo Center

Winneshiek County
 Decorah High School, Decorah
 South Winneshiek High School, Calmar
 Turkey Valley Junior-Senior High School, Jackson Junction

Woodbury County
 Lawton–Bronson Junior/Senior High School, Lawton
 River Valley High School, Correctionville
 Sergeant Bluff-Luton High School, Sergeant Bluff
 Westwood High School, Sloan
 Woodbury Central High School, Moville

Sioux City
 Bishop Heelan Catholic High School
 East High School
 North High School
 Siouxland Christian School
 West High School

Worth County
 Central Springs High School, Manly
 Northwood-Kensett Junior-Senior High School, Northwood

Wright County
 Belmond-Klemme Community Junior-Senior High School, Belmond
 Clarion–Goldfield-Dows High School, Clarion
 Eagle Grove High School, Eagle Grove

See also
 List of school districts in Iowa
 List of private schools in Iowa
 Wikipedia:WikiProject Missing encyclopedic articles/High schools/US/Iowa

Iowa. High schools
High